Guangyangcheng station is a station on Fangshan Line of the Beijing Subway.

Station Layout 
The station has an elevated island platform.

Exits 
There are 4 exits, lettered A1, A2, B1, and B2. Exits A1 and B1 are accessible.

References

Beijing Subway stations in Fangshan District